Matthew James Giteau (born 29 September 1982) is a retired Australian rugby union professional player who last played, for the now defunct,  LA Giltinis of Major League Rugby (MLR). His regular playing positions are inside centre, halfback and fly-half.

Giteau played as a utility back. His usual positions were inside centre and fly-half, although he started his career as a scrum-half. He played for the Wallabies for the first time in 2002 against England at Twickenham and was a nominee for the International Rugby Board Player of the Year in 2004. He has appeared in 104 Super Rugby matches. During his career he has won 103 test caps for Australia. He was re-selected to the national team after several years' absence under a rule known as Giteau's law.

Personal life
Giteau attended St Edmund's College, Canberra, which has produced other Wallabies including George Gregan, Matt Henjak and Ricky Stuart.

His father Ron Giteau is a former professional rugby league footballer, and his older sister Kristy Giteau is a dual-code rugby international for Australia. On 11 December 2010, Matt Giteau married Bianca Franklin, a former netball player with the Adelaide Thunderbirds. They have three children.

Playing career

2001–05
Giteau made his debut for the ACT Brumbies in 2001 and the Wallabies in 2002. During this time he won two Super Rugby titles with the Brumbies in the 2001 Super 12 season and the 2004 Super 12 season and was a part of the Wallabies at the 2003 Rugby World Cup.

2006–07
In April 2006 Giteau announced that he would play for the Western Force Super Rugby team, in the 2007 Super 14 season. He was included in the Wallabies 2006 mid-year rugby tests squad, but was ruled out with an injury. However he recovered in time for the 2006 Tri Nations Series. He came off the bench in the first game in the series.

In 2007, Giteau was selected for the Wallabies 2007 Rugby World Cup and 2008 squad and was first choice No. 12. He also had gained 40 test points, putting him in the top scorer's list in the competition. Giteau took injuries into the match, and the Wallabies lost in the quarter-final to England 10–12.

Following Rugby World Cup, Giteau played fly-half for the Barbarians against Rugby World Cup winners South Africa. Giteau scored a try, and the Barbarians won 22–5.

2008 
In 2008, new Wallabies coach Robbie Deans selected Giteau as Australia's new fly-half, following the retirement of Stephen Larkham.

Giteau played fly-half against Ireland and France in the mid year test. In the 2008 Tri Nations Series, Giteau played in all six games. He played against the All Blacks winning 34–22 at the ANZ Stadium in Sydney, and against South Africa winning 27–15 at Kings Park Stadium in Durban.

Giteau was also a part of the Wallabies' record loss that following week to South Africa 53–8.

Super Rugby
Giteau played for the Western Force for 2007–09. In 2007 the Force finished seventh, and recorded their first home win (17–18 against the Hurricanes).

In 2010 Giteau returned to Canberra and the Brumbies, where he played for 2010 and 2011.

Move to France

During the 2011 Super Rugby season, Giteau signed with the French club Toulon, a move that would take effect after the 2011 Rugby World Cup. Despite not being selected for the Australian World Cup squad, he could not join Toulon until mid-November, as he was still under contract with the Australian Rugby Union through the World Cup. In May 2013 he started as Toulon won the 2013 Heineken Cup Final by 16–15 against Clermont Auvergne. He won three European titles with Toulon starting all three. In 2015 they won three successive European titles, (2013 vs Clermont 16–15, 2014 vs Saracens 23-6, and 2015 vs Clermont 24-18). He also won the Top 14 in 2014.

2015
In 2015, national coach Michael Cheika negotiated with the Australian Rugby Union to allow players with 60 caps or more eligible to represent the Wallabies despite not playing in the Super Rugby known as Giteau's law. Giteau played against the Springboks winning 24–20 at Suncorp Stadium, and against the All Blacks 27–19 at ANZ Stadium. Giteau was selected in the Wallabies 31-man squad to represent in the 2015 Rugby World Cup. In October, during the 2015 Rugby World Cup, Giteau scored his 30th international try for the Wallabies as part of their win against England, knocking them out of the tournament. Giteau was a key player for the Wallabies to reach the Rugby World Cup final, but his World Cup dream was short lasting as Giteau copped a head knock in the opening stages of the match and ruled him out of the match, the Wallabies lost to the All Blacks 17–34

Top League
In March 2017, Giteau announced that he would spend his last season with Toulon as a player-coach. On 15 May 2017, Giteau confirmed his move to Japan with Suntory Sungoliath in the Top League next season.

Major League Rugby
In March 2021 Giteau joined his former Australia teammate, Adam Ashley-Cooper at the LA Giltinis for the 2021 Major League Rugby season.

In August 2021, Giteau announced his retirement from rugby union after a man of the match performance in the Giltini's MLR shield win against Rugby ATL. Giteau was named in the MLR team of the season with 98 points scored in 814 minutes played. Giteau decided to reverse his retirement decision and return to the Giltinis in 2022. He did not play any official games in the 2022 season and retired again at the conclusion of the MLR season.

References

External links
 Brumbies profile
 Wallabies profile
 

1982 births
Living people
Australian Institute of Sport rugby union players
Australian rugby union players
Australia international rugby union players
Barbarian F.C. players
ACT Brumbies players
RC Toulonnais players
Western Force players
Rugby union centres
Rugby union fly-halves
Rugby sevens players at the 2006 Commonwealth Games
Male rugby sevens players
Australian people of French descent
Expatriate rugby union players in France
Commonwealth Games rugby sevens players of Australia
LA Giltinis players
Tokyo Sungoliath players
Australia international rugby sevens players
Rugby union players from Sydney